Octiver Jesse Anderson (August 21, 1940 – July 3, 2014), also known by the nickname "Ow-Wow", was an American blues singer-songwriter and musician, perhaps best known for his 1970 song, "I Got a Problem".

Anderson was born in Paris, Arkansas, in 1940, and he grew up in Tulsa, Oklahoma. By the age of 14, he had moved with his family to Wichita, Kansas. At age 16, Anderson went to Muskogee, Oklahoma, where he joined soul singer Willie Wright. Anderson was a self-taught musician, and he learned to play guitar and saxophone.

The song "I Got a Problem", written by Anderson and Gene Barge, was issued as a single in 1970, with "Mighty Mighty" on the B-side. The single appeared on the U.S. Billboard R&B chart, peaking at No. 35 that year. It also charted on the Billboard Hot 100 peaking at No. 95.

His next singles, "Women's Liberation" b/w "Ow, Wow Man" (written by Anderson and Barge), and "Let Me Back In" b/w "Readings in Astrology" did not chart. The song, "Readings in Astrology", was written and recorded by soul singer Curtis Mayfield.

During his career, Anderson toured with B. B. King, Etta James, and Otis Rush.

In his later years, Anderson suffered with diabetes and cancer. He died in Wichita on July 3, 2014, at the age of 73.

References

External links
 Obituary Octiver J. Anderson August 21, 1940 – July 3, 2014 Dignity Memorial
 Jesse Anderson – I Got A Problem / Mighty Mighty

1940 births
2014 deaths
American blues guitarists
American blues singers
American blues singer-songwriters
American male singer-songwriters
Blues musicians from Arkansas
Musicians from Wichita, Kansas
Singer-songwriters from Arkansas
Singer-songwriters from Kansas